Issa Al-Sabah (born 25 December 1987) is a Jordanian footballer who plays as a winger for Shabab Al-Aqaba.

International career
Issa's first international match with the national senior team was against Columbia on June 6, 2014 at Buenos Aires in Argentina, which resulted in a 3-0 loss for Jordan.

Honors and Participation in International Tournaments

In Asian Games
2006 Asian Games

International goals

References

External links 
 
 

1986 births
Living people
Jordanian footballers
Jordan international footballers
Jordanian people of Palestinian descent
Association football midfielders
Al-Wehdat SC players
Al-Yarmouk FC (Jordan) players
Shabab Al-Ordon Club players
Al-Ramtha SC players
Shabab Al-Aqaba Club players
Jordanian Pro League players
Footballers at the 2006 Asian Games
Al-Nahda Club (Saudi Arabia) players
Al Jeel Club players
Al-Tai FC players
Sportspeople from Amman
Saudi First Division League players
Jordanian expatriate footballers
Jordanian expatriate sportspeople in Saudi Arabia
Expatriate footballers in Saudi Arabia
Asian Games competitors for Jordan